is a town located in Tsuzuki District, Kyoto Prefecture, Japan. , the town has an estimated population of 8,656. The total area is 58.16 km2.

Demographics
Per Japanese census data, the population of Ujitawara has declined slightly in recent decades.

References

External links

Ujitawara official website 

Towns in Kyoto Prefecture